The Korean Film Archive or called Korean Federation of Film Archives and KOFA is the sole film archive in South Korea with nationwide coverage. It was founded in Seoul in 1974 as a non-profit organization. In 1976 KOFA joined the International Federation of Film Archives (FIAF) as an observer, and gained its full membership of FIAF in 1985.

KOFA's main duties are to collect, preserve and categorize films and film-related materials, as well as to foster accessibility to its collections. Most of remaining originals and copies of Korean films are preserved in KOFA. Its main center is in Sangam-dong, Seoul, with two local branch centers in Busan and Bucheon, and a secondary preservation center in Seongnam. Its main center has several public facilities, including Cinematheque KOFA, Korean Film Museum, and a reference library. Recently KOFA has concentrated on digitization of Korean films, and has published several features of the Classic Korean Cinema DVD Collections. It also operates the most reliable online database of Korean films, as well as an online film streaming service.

History 
It was established as a Korean film storage center in 1974 in Namsan-dong, Jung-gu, Seoul, and moved to Seocho-dong in 1990. Since 1991, it has been renamed as Korea Media Center by foundations. It was reorganized into a special corporation based on the Motion Picture Promotion Act in 2002. It built its own building in Sangam-dong, Mapo-gu in May 2007 and formally reopened in the following year. It is composed of auxiliary and restored facilities equipped with an anti-air and photo-related facility for preserving film and other materials, Cinema Tech that provides movie screening and current affairs services, and a cinema that illuminates Korean film industry through the exhibition of film related materials. It is a member of the International Federation of Film Executions (FIAF) regular members, who hosted the Federation General Meeting in Seoul in 2002. It is a public organization for cultural services under the Ministry of Culture, Sports and Tourism in Korea government.

Functions 
KOFA serves three main duties and various kinds of referential access services:
 Film Collection and Categorization
 Film Preservation, Restoration and Digitization
 Film Screening and Referential Services
 Publication of Academic and Referential Resources
 Operation of Online Databases on Korean Cinema
 KOFA Film Collection Search
 Korean Movie Database online

Blu-ray releases 
To coincide with its upcoming 40th anniversary in 2014, KOFA started releasing restored Korean classic and less known films on blu-ray.

One of the criteria for release of the films is their place in TOP 100 Korean films list.

The Housemaid, Aimless Bullet and The March of Fools received equal number of votes and they occupy the first place.

See also 
 International Federation of Film Archives
 Cinematheque
 Cinema of Korea

References

External links 
 Korean Film Archive website
 Korean Film Video On Demand

Film archives in Asia
Archives in South Korea
Film organizations in South Korea
1974 establishments in South Korea
Arts organizations established in 1974
FIAF-affiliated institutions